ŽRK Radnički Belgrade (Serbian Cyrillic: Женски рукометни клуб Раднички Београд) is a women's handball club from Belgrade, Serbia. Currently, ŽRK Radnički Belegrade competes in the Handball League of Serbia. ŽRK Radnički Belegrade is the most successful Serbian women's handball club.

Achievements
EHF Women's Champions League :
 Winners (3) : 1975/76, 1979/80, 1983/84
 Runner-up (4) : 1980/81, 1981/82, 1982/83, 1984/85
 Semi finalist (2) : 1973/74, 1976/77
EHF Women's Cup Winners' Cup :
 Winners (3) : 1985/86, 1990/91, 1991/92
National Championship :
 Winners (14) : 1972, 1973, 1975, 1976, 1977, 1978, 1979, 1980, 1981, 1982, 1983, 1984, 1986, 1987
National Cup :
 Winners (13) : 1970, 1973, 1975, 1976, 1979, 1983, 1985, 1986, 1990, 1991, 1992, 1994, 2003

Notable former players
 Svetlana Kitić - In 2010, she was voted the best female handball player ever by the International Handball Federation
 Slavica Jeremić - Olympic Silver Medalist
 Bojana Radulović - Olympic Silver Medalist
 Nataliya Matryuk - Olympic Bronze Medalist
 Andrea Lekić
 Sanja Damnjanović
 Tatjana Polajnar (Tanja Polajnar)
 Svetlana Ognjenović
 Jelena Erić (Jelena Rakonjac)
 Stana Vuković
 Mirjana Milenković
 Vesna Buđa
 Ivanka Šuprinović
 Milenka Sladić
 Mira Radaković
 Jadranka Antić
 Milena Delić
 Ljiljana Knežević
 Marica Rogić
 Ljubica Bukurov
 Dušanka Lazarević
 Zdenka Leutar 
 Marina Dmitrović

References

Serbian handball clubs
Sport in Belgrade
Handball clubs established in 1949